The 17th congressional district of Ohio is an obsolete congressional district last represented by Representative Tim Ryan.

This district became obsolete for the 113th Congress in 2013 as congressional district lines were redrawn to accommodate the loss of the seat as a result of the 2010 Census. Most of the territory within the current 17th district has been merged into the Akron-based 13th district.

List of members representing the district

Recent election results
The following chart shows recent election results. Bold type indicates victor. Italic type indicates incumbent.

References

 Congressional Biographical Directory of the United States 1774–present

17
Former congressional districts of the United States
Constituencies established in 1833
1833 establishments in Ohio
Constituencies disestablished in 2013
2013 disestablishments in Ohio